Muhammad Ali and Alfredo Evangelista fought a boxing match on May 16, 1977. Ali won the bout through a unanimous decision on points (71-65, 72-64 72-64). There was a crowd of about 12,000 at the Capital Centre and this bout was televised in primetime on ABC.

Evangelista entered the bout ranked eighth by the WBA and 10th by the WBC.

The Fight
The fight proved to be a difficult defense for the champion. Evangelista was able to go the distance with Ali, and was able to land his powerful left hook at several occasions, but only stunned the champion twice (in the sixth and eighth round). Ali heavily used his rope-a-dope tactic, mixed in with his occasional use of the shuffle to outmaneuver the challenger. At several occasions Ali landed effective combinations and came close to shutting out the 209.5 pound challenger (Ali had slimmed down from 240 to 221 1/4 for this bout), but was unable to knock him out. The longer the fight lasted, the bolder Evangelista got, but Ali ultimately won the fight by unanimous decision. The decision was booed by The Capital Centre crowd.

Undercard
Alfredo Escalera KO 8 Carlos Becerril Escalera retains WBC world Junior Lightweight Title
Roberto Durán UD 10 Javier Muniz 
Tyrone Everett TKO 4 Delfino Rodriguez

Quotes
"I'm sorry, we televised it" Howard Cosell doing the bout for ABC who later said that this was one of the worst bouts he's ever seen.

"I'm 35 and I danced for 15 rounds, it's a miracle". Ali after his bout with Evangelista.

References

Evangelista
1977 in boxing
World Boxing Association heavyweight championship matches
World Boxing Council heavyweight championship matches
May 1977 sports events in the United States
Boxing in Maryland